Jarrod Bannister (3 October 1984 – 8 February 2018) was an Australian track and field athlete who competed in the javelin throw. His personal best throw of 89.02 metres, achieved in 2008, is the Australian and Oceanian record.

Career
Bannister was born in Townsville, Queensland on 3 October 1984. He won the youth javelin title at the Australian Athletics Championships in 2001. He later won five senior javelin national titles: in 2006, 2007, 2009, 2010, and 2012. He competed twice at the World Championships in Athletics, placing eleventh in qualifying in 2007 and finishing seventh in the final in 2011. He represented his country at the Olympic Games in 2008 and 2012, finishing sixth at the former and placing twenty-seventh in the qualifying stage of the latter. He won gold at the 2010 Commonwealth Games – the first and only international senior medal of his career. This made him the first Australian winner in that event for nearly fifty years, following in the footsteps of 1962 champion Alf Mitchell.

In June 2013, he received a 20-month doping ban after missing three tests in the previous 18 months, which is equivalent to a failed test. He maintained this was accidental and said the testers were given incorrect information on one occasion. He returned to competition in 2015. He also competed in 2016 but did not participate in the 2017 season.

Death
On 8 February 2018, Bannister was found dead in his home in Eindhoven, Netherlands, where he was living with his girlfriend while training. Fairfax Media reported there were no suspicious circumstances surrounding his death. Athletics commentator and ex-Olympian David Culbert said Bannister was "a super athlete who sadly had many demons".

International competitions

Seasonal bests
2002 – 73.31
2006 – 78.06
2007 – 83.70
2008 – 89.02
2010 – 83.17
2011 – 82.25
2012 – 83.70
2013 – 79.99
2015 – 76.09
2016 – 78.29

See also
List of Commonwealth Games medallists in athletics (men)
List of javelin throw national champions (men)
List of Australian athletics champions (men)
List of doping cases in athletics

References

External links

1984 births
2018 deaths
Sportspeople from Townsville
Australian male javelin throwers
Olympic athletes of Australia
Athletes (track and field) at the 2008 Summer Olympics
Athletes (track and field) at the 2012 Summer Olympics
Commonwealth Games medallists in athletics
Commonwealth Games gold medallists for Australia
Athletes (track and field) at the 2006 Commonwealth Games
Athletes (track and field) at the 2010 Commonwealth Games
World Athletics Championships athletes for Australia
Doping cases in Australian track and field
Medallists at the 2010 Commonwealth Games